Sandnessjøen Idrettslag is a Norwegian sports club from Sandnessjøen, Alstahaug, Nordland. It has sections for association football and team handball.

The men's football team currently plays in the Third Division, the fourth tier of Norwegian football. It last played in the Norwegian Second Division in 1997. Their men's handball team currently plays in the third division and goes by the nickname "Swingers".

Current squad

Updated 9 April 2013

For season transfers, see transfers winter 2011–12 and transfers summer 2012.

References

External links
 Official site 
 Stamnes Arena - Nordic Stadiums

Football clubs in Norway
Sport in Nordland
Association football clubs established in 1914
1914 establishments in Norway